Direct navigation describes the method individuals use to navigate the World Wide Web in order to arrive at specific websites. Direct navigation is a 10-year-old term which is generally understood to include type-in traffic.

Direct navigation traffic was first discovered circa 1996. The few lucky domainers who had premium names and analyzed their traffic found people were typing in their domain names and bypassing search engines. Many of them immediately realized the potential of these domain names. At that time the direct navigation segment of the World Wide Web was born.

Domainers describe direct navigation as an Internet user navigating to a website directly through the browser address bar. They bypass online search engines by typing a name like "hotels" and adding ".com". For that reason direct navigation traffic is more valuable than search engine traffic since it is better targeted. Short words that describe large segments of a market are the most valuable direct navigation names. Domainers call these names premium names and they have sold in the millions of dollars year after year since 1997.

Marketers also include bookmarked traffic in the direct navigation group. Domainers do not consider bookmarked traffic as direct navigation since in most cases they do not involve a direct navigation premium domain name. A bookmark is made when an internet user actively adds a URL to their list of bookmarked pages. This is very different from using the browser address line to navigate to a premium domain name like hotels.com. Hence the inclusion of bookmarked traffic is not included in the domainer's version of the direct navigation market.

A 2005 study of Internet traffic by WebSideStory's StatMarket division revealed that direct navigation traffic such as browser type-in traffic, bookmarks of existing sites, and visits to existing, known website domain names converts into sales for advertisers at 4.23% of total visits compared to 2.3% for product and service related searches performed via the search box at search engines such as Google and Yahoo.

In September, 2008, the first direct navigation search engine, ubexact.com was released. In addition to providing results by type in traffic, the search engine utilized new proprietary technology that was able to provide in context search results from one URL to the next URL.

References

Online advertising